Hathaway is an English surname. Notable people and characters with the name include:

 Anne Hathaway (born 1982), American actress 
 Anne Hathaway (wife of Shakespeare) (1556–1623), wife of William Shakespeare
 Arthur Stafford Hathaway (1855-1934), American mathematician
 Bradley Hathaway (born 1982), American poet and musician
 Don Hathaway (born 1928), American politician from Shreveport, Louisiana
 Donny Hathaway (1945–1979), soul musician
 Eulaulah Donyll Hathaway (born 1968), best known as Lalah Hathaway, R&B/jazz singer
 Garnet Hathaway (born 1991), American ice hockey player
 George Luther Hathaway (1813–1872), Canadian politician
 Henry Hathaway (1898–1985), American film director and producer
 Horace K. Hathaway (1878-1944), American consulting engineer
 John Hathaway (born 1987), English mixed martial arts fighter
 Joy Hathaway, (?-1954), Canadian-born American actress
 Lalah Hathaway, American Musician
 Melissa Hathaway, a cybersecurity expert who served in the Obama administration
 Millicent Hathaway (1898–1974), American nutritionist and physiological chemist
 Noah Hathaway (born 1971), American film actor
 Ray Hathaway (1916–2015), American baseball player
 Robert Hathaway (1887–1954), Seigneur of Sark
 Sibyl Hathaway (1884–1974), Dame of Sark
 Stanley K. Hathaway (1924–2005), American politician
 William Hathaway (1924–2013), American politician from Maine
 Winifred Hathaway, (1870 - 1954), Welsh-born American educator

Fictional characters
 Michelle, Taylor, and Frankie Hathaway from The Haunted Hathaways
 James Hathaway, a detective sergeant and principal character in the British television series, Lewis
 Jane Hathaway, recurring character in The Beverly Hillbillies
 Carol Hathaway, a character from ER (TV series) 
 Rose Hathaway and Janine Hathaway, characters from Vampire Academy
 Hathaway Noa, a character from the Gundam franchise
 Simon Hathaway, a character from the Assassin's Creed franchise.

English-language surnames